Valle de Valdelucio is a municipality located in the province of Burgos, Castile and León, Spain. According to the 2004 census (INE), the municipality has a population of 350 inhabitants.

See also
Páramos (shire)
Valle del Rudrón

References

Municipalities in the Province of Burgos